Cassinopsis ilicifolia is a spined, straggling shrub or liane that is native to the moister regions of southern Africa. It is named ilicifolia due to the leaves with somewhat serrated leaf margins, which resemble those of the genus Ilex.

Gallery

References

Flora of Southern Africa
Cassinopsis